Vojtech Tóth (born 16 November 1938) is a Slovak wrestler. He competed in the men's Greco-Roman featherweight at the 1960 Summer Olympics.

References

1938 births
Living people
Slovak male sport wrestlers
Olympic wrestlers of Czechoslovakia
Wrestlers at the 1960 Summer Olympics
People from Dunajská Streda District
Sportspeople from the Trnava Region